Cushing's Regiment of Militia (also known as the 6th Worcester County Militia Regiment) was called up at Westborough, Massachusetts on August 16, 1777, as reinforcements for the Continental Army during the Saratoga Campaign. The regiment marched quickly to join the gathering forces of General Horatio Gates as he faced British General John Burgoyne in northern New York. The regiment served in Brigadier General Jonathan Warner's brigade. With the surrender of Burgoyne's Army on October 17, the regiment was disbanded on November 29, 1777.

Massachusetts American Revolutionary War militia regiments